Nil FM is the 2004 album of Nil Karaibrahimgil, a female Turkish music singer-songwriter. Nil FM is also the name of a live project by Nil, where she performed on stage, in the setting of a radio studio. The album also includes commercial jingles she composed and sang.

Track listing

All songs written by Nil Karaibrahimgil (except Ben aptal mıyım? is composed by Ozan Çolakoğlu)

External links 
 

2004 albums
Nil Karaibrahimgil albums
Albums produced by Ozan Çolakoğlu